The following is a list of test cards used by the BBC at various points in broadcasting.

Tuning Signals

The first "Tuning Signals" test card was broadcast by the BBC in 1934. It was a simple line and circle broadcast using Baird's 30-line system, and was used to synchronise the mechanical scanning system.

Test Card A
Test Card A made its debut in 1937. However, it and Test Card B were soon replaced by the more useful Test Card C.

Test Card B

Test Card B was an early BBC television test card. It was very similar to Test Card A but was never broadcast, possibly used by BBC engineers for internal use. The original card has since gone missing. The only difference was it had an extra greyscale stripe below the circle.

The letter box in Test Card A was moved to the top of the card.

Test Card C

Test Card C was a BBC television test card first broadcast in 1948. It was the first test card to resemble the famous Test Card F. It was also available as individual rolls of test film in the UK and many Commonwealth countries up until the end of the black-and-white television era.

Test Card D
Test Card D was a BBC television test card first broadcast in 1964. This was the first test card to be based on a specification. Later, a "Reduced Power" Test Card D was introduced.

Test Card E (later Test Card C)

Test Card E was a television test card designed in 1964 and made to accommodate the 625-line system on BBC2, as opposed to the 405-line system of Test Card D. However, depending on the source, Test Card E was either reported to have lasted for only one day or for up to a month before being withdrawn. Test Card E was thereafter replaced by a modified version of Test Card C, which lasted on BBC2 until 1967 when the colour Test Card F was introduced. The modified Test Card C also aired on BBC1 (with the BBC1 logo replacing the "BBC2 625 LINES" caption) until it was similarly replaced by Test Card F around 1969–1972. Test Card E did however see later usage by RTÉ in Ireland and RTP in Portugal alongside Test Card D.

Test Card F

Test Card F was the BBC's longest-running and most famous test card, featuring Carole Hersee and Bubbles the Clown. There have been many different Test Card F variations. It was first broadcast on 2 July 1967 (the day after the first colour pictures appeared to the public on television) on BBC2.

Test Card G
Test Card G was a television test card broadcast occasionally by the BBC. It was the first electronically generated test card to be broadcast, and was a variant of the Philips PM5544 test card. This test card was generally used by local transmitters for opt outs or during times when a particular region was not showing a programme broadcast from London. It was also used in place of Test Card F nationally from time to time when the projector showing the latter test card's photographic slide was not available or undergoing maintenance until Test Card F was converted to electronic form in 1984. Test Card G was also occasionally used by ITV alongside Test Card F before completely switching over to the ETP-1 test card in 1979.

Another Test Card G, unrelated, was developed by Pye as a monochrome variant on Test Card C. It was used in other countries that use 625-line PAL, such as Bulgaria, Denmark, Luxembourg, Thailand Barbados and Malaysia, but not in Britain. A slightly modified version of the Pye Test Card G was used by YLE in Finland until it switched to the colour Telefunken FuBK test card in the 1970s, as well as in Norway where NRK used it in conjunction with the EIA 1956 resolution chart until it switched to the Philips PM5544, Test Card F and the Telefunken FuBK test cards in the 1970s.

Test Card H

Test Card H was designed as a line up chart for cameras in-studio, possibly to test chroma specifications as well as resolution and bandwidth. The "H" designation was solely used for this chart, and was therefore never allocated to a Test Card used for broadcasting; following this, the letter "I" was also passed over as a Test Card letter, having been considered too similar to the number "1", therefore leading to Test Card J being the next in the series.

Test Card J

Test Card J is an enhanced revision of Test Card F, first broadcast in November 1999.

Test Card W

Test Card W is a widescreen update of Test Card F, first broadcast on 6 November 1998 as part of a joke on Have I Got News For You to censor then-host Angus Deayton about discussing Peter Mandelson's life. This test card was designed for the 16:9 (widescreen) ratio.

Test Card X

The high-definition version of Test Card W is visually similar but officially lacks a designation letter. This version is often referred to as Test Card X, but this is not a designation which the BBC recognises. It is designed for use on high-definition TV services, & had been included a part of BBC HD's preview loop since November 2008 (though it had been in use internally at the BBC for several years prior) until the channel's closure in March 2013.

Unidentified test card

An electronically generated image was first broadcast on 21 June 1997 on BBC2 between 3am and 4am. It was also broadcast in October 1997 from 3:29am until 3:44am, when, at the same time, BBC1 showed Test Card G. Both channels reverted over to these at the same time, and reverted to TCF at the same time, as part of a switching test with BBC Birmingham, whereby in the event of a need to evacuate BBC TV to Pebble Mill Studios in Birmingham, such as a power failure as happened in June 2000, a switch would be thrown, putting Birmingham (nowadays Red Bee Media run by two Network Directors simultaneously at MediaCityUK, Salford Quays, Manchester and White City Place, London to negate the need for these Disaster Recovery arrangements) in control of the network, until BBC Television Centre (prior to 2013)/new Broadcasting House, London (since 2013) can regain control. Both TCG and this image were transmitted from Birmingham to prove the switching facility worked.
This test card was then seen again on 17 April 2007 between 4am and 5am during the BBC Learning Zone. Both transmissions were accompanied by a 4-tone test tone, ranging from extremely low frequency to a very high shrill. It is unknown if this Test Card has a name, though this test card has also been known to be used on point-to-point satellite links originating from the Fucino Space Centre and other places in Italy (Telefisco, Lapet, etc), and by Marconi Portugal. Another version, modified for NTSC, was used by Televisión Nacional de Chile (TVN) in the 1990s.

Untransmitted test cards
There have been a number of untransmitted test cards. They would most likely be for internal use inside the BBC. Most of them are adapted from Test Card F.

Comic Relief test card
A Comic Relief test card was broadcast on BBC1 on 18 March 1993 as part of Comic Relief. This test card featured ten-year-old competition winner Hannah Marriott, wearing a red nose.

See also
 Trade test colour films
 PM5544
 ETP-1
 Video-signal generator

References

External links
 The Test Card Circle  Details of the UK's Trade Test Transmissions including the history of the BBC and ITA Test Cards, a look at the music used and full details about the Trade Test Colour Films shown from the late fifties to 1973.
 BBC Test Card Video
 BBC The Television Test Card
 BBC Test Cards from meldrum.co.uk
 A Very Concise History of Test Cards by Frank Mitchell

Test cards
BBC test cards
1967 establishments in the United Kingdom
Telecommunications-related introductions in 1967